The Ghotra are a Labana clan in India. Ghotra may also refer to:
 Ghotra (Ramgarhia), a Ramgarhia clan in Punjab, India

See also
 Gotra, an Indian Hindu term meaning lineage